Kirsten is a Swedish, Danish and Norwegian form of the name Christina.

Music 
 Kirsten Flagstad (1895–1962), Norwegian opera singer
 Kirsten Rosenberg, American rock/metal singer

Sports 
 Kirsten Barnes (born 1968), Canadian rower and Olympic champion
 Kirsten Venetta Brown (1963–2006), American slalom canoeist
 Kirsten Bruhn (born 1969), German female Paralympic swimmer
 Kirsten Flipkens, Belgian tennis player; 2003 ITF Junior World Champion
 Kirsten Hedegaard Jensen (born 1935), Danish Olympic swimmer
 Kirsten Plum Jensen (born 1961), Danish Olympic rower
 Kirsten Olson (born 1991), American figure skater
 Kirsten Melkevik Otterbu (born 1970), Norwegian long-distance runner
 Kirsten Thomson (born 1983), Australian middle distance freestyle swimmer

Television and film 
 Kirsten Bishop, voice actress best known for her roles as Zoycite and Kaori Knight in the English version of Sailor Moon
 Kirsten Bourne, actress who played the role of Tessa Campanelli in the hit Canadian television series Degrassi High
 Kirsten Dunst (born 1982), American actress of German and Swedish descent
 Kirsten Imrie (born 1967), former glamour model, actress and television presenter
 Kirsten Magasdi, BBC World reporter often seen reporting for Fast Track
 Kirsten O'Brien (born 1972), British TV presenter
 Kirsten Price (actress) (born 1981), adult film actress and reality TV star
 Kirsten Price (musician) (born 1979), English-American singer-songwriter
 Kirsten Prout (born 1990), Canadian actress, best known for ABC Family shows, Kyle XY and The Lying Game.
 Kirsten Storms (born 1984), American actress 
 Kirsten Vangsness (born 1972), American actress

Other fields 
 Kirsten Abrahamson, Canadian ceramic artist
 Kirsten Bakis (born 1967), Swiss-born author of Lives of the Monster Dogs
 Kirsten Costas (1968–1984), American homicide victim
 Kirsten Davidson, model from Australia
 Kirsten Engel, American attorney and elected representative
 Kirsten Gillibrand (born 1966), American politician and lawyer; United States Senator (D-NY)
 Kirsten Jacobsen (1942–2010), Danish politician 
 Kirsten Klein (born 1945), Danish photographer
 Kirsten Livermore (born 1969), Australian politician
 Kirsten Munk (1598–1658), Morganatic royal consort

Characters 
 Kirsten Cohen, a fictional character on the Fox television series The O.C.
 Kirsten Gannon, a fictional character from the Australian soap opera Neighbours Kirsten Larson, protagonist of American Girl's Kirsten historical series
 Princess Kirsten of Norway, a fictional character in the 2006 rom-com film The Prince & Me 2: The Royal Wedding''

See also
 Kirsteen
 Kirsten
 Kirsti
 Kerstin
 Kirsty
 Hurricane Kirsten

References

Danish feminine given names
English feminine given names
Norwegian feminine given names
Swedish feminine given names